Quatrochess is a chess variant for four players invented by George R. Dekle Sr. in 1986. It is played on a square 14×14 board that excludes the four central squares. Each player controls a standard set of sixteen chess pieces, and additionally nine fairy pieces. The game can be played in partnership (two opposing teams of two) or all-versus-all.

Quatrochess was included in World Game Review No. 10 edited by Michael Keller.

Game rules
The illustration shows the starting setup. White moves first and play proceeds clockwise around the board. Teammates sit in opposite corners in partnership games.

The squareless center may not be moved to or through; however, it may be jumped over by pieces that leap (knight, chancellor, archbishop, camel, and giraffe). The king, queen, rook, bishop, knight, and pawn move and capture as they do in chess. Each player's eight pawns are divided into two groups of four: one group moves forward along , the other along . As in chess, pawns have an initial two-step option, en passant is possible, and promotion occurs at the board's end. There is no castling in Quatrochess.

Fairy piece moves
The fairy pieces all capture the same as they move:
 The chancellor moves as a chess rook and knight.
 The archbishop moves as a chess bishop and knight.
 The mann moves as a chess king, but has no .
 The wazir moves one step orthogonally in any direction.
 The ferz moves one step diagonally in any direction.
 A camel leaps in a (1,3) pattern like an elongated knight's move. It jumps over any intervening men.
 A giraffe leaps in a (1,4) pattern like an elongated knight's move. It jumps over any intervening men.

Winning
When a player is checkmated or stalemated, his king is immediately removed from the game and his remaining men become the property of the player delivering the mate or stalemate (all-versus-all game), or of his teammate (partnership game). The last surviving player (or team) is the winner.

See also
 Four-player chess
 Also by George Dekle:
 Tri-Chess – a three-player variant with triangular cells, chancellors and cardinals
 Three-Man Chess – a three-player variant with quadrilateral cells

References

Bibliography

Chess variants
Fairy chess
1986 in chess
Board games introduced in 1986